The  was an electric multiple unit (EMU) train type operated by the private railway operator Tokyu Corporation in Japan from 1954 until 1986.

Specifications

Formations
The trains were formed as three-car sets, and were later lengthened to up to six cars per trainset.

Interior
The interior consisted of longitudinal seating. The heat of the resistors could be used to heat the passenger compartments.

History
The trains entered service on October 16, 1954. A total of 105 cars were built by Tokyu Car from 1954 to 1959. Toyoko Line services operated with 5000 series trains ended in March 1980.

The 5000 series was withdrawn from Meguro Line services in June 1986, and the trains were retired after a farewell run in July 1986.

New Tokyu 5000 series set 5122 received a green vinyl wrapping livery in September 2017, reminiscent of the original 5000 series' livery.

Other operators
About 70 former Tokyu 5000 series vehicles were transferred to other operators. Transfer of former 5000 series trains to Nagano Electric Railway began in 1977. They were also operated by Gakunan Railway, Ueda Electric Railway, Matsumoto Electric Railway, Fukushima Kotsu, and Kumamoto Electric Railway.

Preserved examples
Deha 5001: was preserved in front of Shibuya Station, Tokyo, relocated to Odate, Akita in June 2020

Matsumoto Electric Railway (Matsuden): one train stored, was repainted into its former Tokyu livery in 2012

References

Electric multiple units of Japan
5000 series (1954)
Train-related introductions in 1954
1500 V DC multiple units of Japan
Tokyu Car multiple units